Cunningham Wash is a wash in eastern Beaver County, Utah, United States.

Description
The wash begins north of Bearskin Mountain and runs southeast briefly before turning south to along the east side of the Mineral Mountains and empty into the Wildcat Creek, northwest of the city of Beaver.

Cunningham Wash derives its name from Cunningham Matthews, a local pioneer.

See also

 Arroyo (creek)
 List of canyons and gorges in Utah
 List of rivers in Utah

References

Landforms of Beaver County, Utah
Arroyos and washes of the United States